Josifović is a Serbian surname, a patronymic derived from given name Josif (English equivalent Joseph). It may refer to:

 (1868–1941), Serbian brigadier general of the Royal Yugoslav Army
Mihailo "Mikajle" Josifović (died 1941), guerrilla, member of Serbian Chetnik Organization
Stanislav Josifović, politician in the Serbian puppet Commissioner Government
Emilijan Josifović, Serbian Orthodox priest, signatory of Vukovar resolution
Antonije Josifovic

See also
Josipović, Croatian variant
Josifovski, Macedonian variant

Serbian surnames
Patronymic surnames
Surnames from given names